The Florida Mutineers is an American professional Call of Duty League (CDL) esports team based in Florida. Florida Mutineers is owned by Misfits Gaming, which also owns an Overwatch League team called the Florida Mayhem.

History 
On August 20, 2019, Activision Blizzard announced that Misfits Gaming had purchased one of the two new franchise slots for the Call of Duty League. According to ESPN, the publisher was looking to sell slots for approximately $25 million per team. On October 28, 2019, branding was revealed as the Florida Mutineers. On December 2, 2019, they revealed the five-man starting roster of Prestinni, Frosty, Skyz, Havok, and Maux and coach Atura.

After splitting their first two series of the 2020 season at the CDL 2020 Launch Weekend event, the Mutineers outperformed expectations at the Atlanta FaZe Home Series. After losing 3–2 to the London Royal Ravens in their first series, Florida survived elimination matches against Optic Gaming Los Angeles and London, taking these series 3-1 and 3–2, respectively. In the semifinals, Prestinni and the Mutineers ousted twin Arcitys and the Chicago Huntsmen 3–2 to meet the Atlanta FaZe in the finals, where they would lose 3–0.

Sometime prior to their next event, CDL Los Angeles, Prestinni made the decision to take some time away from the competitive scene, leading to the team's signing and immediate starting of Maurice "Fero" Henriquez. This would turn out to be a permanent move, however, as Fero would remain in the starting lineup even after Prestinni's return in late March 2020. The new lineup of Fero, Frosty, Skyz, Havok, and Maux would fall short at CDL Los Angeles, going 1–2 in matches with a 3-7 map count. They would bounce back with an event win at CDL Dallas, making a loser's bracket run before dropping the Minnesota ROKKR in the finals for their first win of the 2020 season. An early exit from their own home series, however, would prove to be the catalyst for change. An underperforming Maux was replaced with standout amateur player Joe "Owakening" Conley prior to CDL Minnesota. The new lineup saw unprecedented success across the next two events; Owakening, Fero, Frosty, Havok, and Skyz blitzed through CDL Minnesota and CDL Paris with an 8-0 match record and 24-9 map count.

Team Identity 
The Florida Mutineers' colors are orange, turquoise, and black. Their logo is a stylized kraken wearing a tricorn hat, representing their pirate theme.

Current roster

References

External links
 

Call of Duty League teams
Esports teams based in the United States
Esports teams established in 2019

Sports teams in Florida
Venture capital-funded esports teams